Vitaliy Viktorovych Kaverin (born 4 September 1990 in Khmelnytskyi, Ukrainian SSR) is a professional Ukrainian football striker who plays for Podillya Khmelnytskyi.

Kaverin is product of FC Podillya Khmelnytskyi youth sportive school. His first trainer was Mykola Shershun. Played in the Ukrainian Premier League.

Honours 
2009 UEFA European Under-19 Football Championship: Champion

References

External links
 
 

1990 births
Living people
Ukrainian footballers
Ukraine under-21 international footballers
Ukraine youth international footballers
FC Dnipro players
FC Kryvbas Kryvyi Rih players
FC Metalurh Zaporizhzhia players
Ukrainian Premier League players
Sportspeople from Khmelnytskyi, Ukraine
FC Dynamo-2 Kyiv players
FC Hoverla Uzhhorod players
Association football forwards
FC Chornomorets Odesa players
FC Podillya Khmelnytskyi players